Dave Madsen is an American politician who is currently the representative for Pennsylvania's 104th District. He had previously served as a member of the Harrisburg City Council for five years starting in 2017.

Political career

Harrisburg City Council

Before being elected to the Pennsylvania House of Representatives, Madsen served as a member of the Harrisburg City Council for five years starting in 2017 as a Democrat. During his time as councilmen, Madsen fostered community outreach and worked as the AFL–CIO community services and education director. He was also the chair of the council’s public works committee.

Pennsylvania's 104th District

Madsen announced he would run for Pennsylvania's 104th District as a Democrat which saw its longtime incumbent Republican Representative Sue Helm retire, as well as being redistricted to include Harrisburg. He ran on a campaign calling for increased funding for public education, workforce development and addressing infrastructure issues. He was endorsed by Dauphin County Commissioner George Hartwick and Harrisburg Mayor Wanda Williams, along with a number of Harrisburg, Steelton and county officials. In the election he faced off against Keystone candidate David Kocur. He defeated Kocur with 11,563 votes or 70.5% of the electorate to Kocur's 4,838 votes or 29.5% of the electorate.

Madsen took office at the opening of the Pennsylvania house on January 2, 2023.

Election Results

References

1987 births
Living people
Democratic Party members of the Pennsylvania House of Representatives
Politicians from Harrisburg, Pennsylvania
Candidates in the 2022 United States elections
21st-century American politicians